Pleasure & the Pain is the twelfth studio album by Saga. It is the first and only album to feature Glen Sobel on drums.

Track listing

Personnel
 Michael Sadler – lead vocals
 Ian Crichton – guitars
 Jim Gilmour – keyboards, vocals
 Glen Sobel – drums
 Jim Crichton – bass

References

1997 albums
Saga (band) albums
SPV/Steamhammer albums